Lunuwila is a town in the Puttalam District, North Western Province, Sri Lanka. 

The Coconut Research Institute of Sri Lanka, founded in 1929, is located on the Bandirippuwa Estate in Lunuwila.

Transport 
The town is on the intersection of the B473 (Wennappuwa - Kirimetiyana Road) and the Sirigampala Para.

The Lunuwila train station is the ninth station on the Puttalam rail line.

See also 
 Railway stations in Sri Lanka

References 

Populated places in Sri Lanka